Edgar Osborne Brown (August 26, 1880 – March 11, 1937) was an American football, basketball and baseball coach and college athletics administrator. He coached at a number of colleges including Parsons College in Fairfield, Iowa, Bethany College in Lindsborg, Kansas, Maryville College in Maryville, Tennessee, Central College—now known as Central Methodist University—in Fayette, Missouri and Arkansas Polytechnic College—now known as Arkansas Tech University—in Russellville, Arkansas. In the 1930s, Brown was the athletic director at the College of the Ozarks—now known as the University of the Ozarks—in Clarksville, Arkansas.

Playing career
Brown played college football at Wabash College in Crawfordsville, Indiana from 1907 to 1909. He also lettered in baseball, basketball, and track and field at Wabash. He set intercollegiate records for the state of Indiana in the shot put and discus throw.

Coaching career
Brown was the head football coach at the Bethany College in Lindsborg, Kansas from 1915 to 1916, compiling a record of 3–11–1.

Death
Brown died on March 11, 1937, in Clarksville, after suffering a paralytic stroke.

Head coaching record

References

1880 births
1937 deaths
American football tackles
American male discus throwers
American male shot putters
American men's basketball players
Arkansas Tech Wonder Boys baseball coaches
Arkansas Tech Wonder Boys basketball coaches
Arkansas Tech Wonder Boys football coaches
Bethany Swedes football coaches
Central Methodist Eagles football coaches
Maryville Scots football coaches
Ozarks Eagles athletic directors
Ozarks Mountaineers football coaches
Parsons Wildcats football coaches
Wabash Little Giants baseball players
Wabash Little Giants basketball players
Wabash Little Giants football players
College men's track and field athletes in the United States
People from Sevierville, Tennessee
Coaches of American football from Tennessee
Players of American football from Tennessee
Baseball coaches from Tennessee
Baseball players from Tennessee
Basketball coaches from Tennessee
Basketball players from Tennessee
Track and field athletes from Tennessee